Mary Ann Conroy (née O'Connor) was a Democratic State Senator in Maryland representing District 23A, Prince George's County from 1982-1983 and a member of the Maryland House of Delegates, from May 1986 to January 10, 2007. She was born in 1931 in New York City and died in 2014 in Annapolis of hepatitis.

Committees
 2003-2007 Deputy Majority Leader
 2003-2007 Economic Matters Committee
 1986-1993, 1999-2003 Ways and Means Committee
 1998 Judiciary Committee
 1994-1997 Commerce and Government Matters Committee
 1994-2007 Rules and Executive Nominations Committee
 2004-2007 Joint Committee on Federal Relations

References

Democratic Party Maryland state senators
Democratic Party members of the Maryland House of Delegates
1931 births
2014 deaths